Alexandre Kalache (born 28 February 1952) is a Brazilian volleyball player. He competed at the 1972 Summer Olympics and the 1976 Summer Olympics. Kalache played college volleyball for USC, leading them to their first NCAA title in 1977.

References

External links
 

1952 births
Living people
Brazilian men's volleyball players
Olympic volleyball players of Brazil
Volleyball players at the 1972 Summer Olympics
Volleyball players at the 1976 Summer Olympics
Volleyball players from Rio de Janeiro (city)
USC Trojans men's volleyball players
Pan American Games medalists in volleyball
Pan American Games silver medalists for Brazil
Medalists at the 1975 Pan American Games